Jason Thomas may refer to:

 Jason Thomas (Marine), United States Marine who located and rescued people after the collapse of the World Trade Center
 Jason Thomas (footballer) (born 1997), Vanuatuan footballer
 Jason Thomas, drummer with the band Forq